The Student Peace Prize is awarded biennially to a student or a student organization that has made a significant contribution to creating peace and promoting human rights. The prize is awarded on behalf of all Norwegian students, and is administrated by the Student Peace Prize Secretariat in Trondheim, which appoints a national nominations committee with representatives from universities and colleges in Norway, as well as an independent Peace Prize Committee that awards the prize. The award ceremony takes place during the International Student Festival in Trondheim (ISFiT).

The Committee
As of 2010 the Peace Prize Committee has nine members, and is composed of four representatives from the National Union of Students in Norway (NSO), one representative from the Students’ and Academics’ International Assistance Fund (SAIH), and four non-student expert members.

The members of the 2011 committee was Ole Danbolt Mjøs, former chairman of the Nobel Peace Prize committee, Børge Brende, former Minister of Trade and Industry and current general-secretary of Red Cross Norway, district- and news editor in the Norwegian Broadcasting Corporation (NRK) Gro Holm, Vigdis Lian, head of the Norwegian UNESCO-commission, President of the National Union of Students in Norway (NSO) Anne Karine Nymoen and President of the Students' and Academics' International Assistance Fund (SAIH), Runar Myrnes Balto.

The committee of 2019 consisted of among others Red Party politician Bjørnar Moxnes, Torunn Tryggestad from International Peace Research Institute (PRIO), Gro Lindstad from FOKUS (Forum for Women and Development) and Sven Mollekleiv, former Honorary President of the Norwegian Red Cross.

Former committee members include former Prime Minister and director of The Oslo Center for Peace and Human Rights Kjell Magne Bondevik, NUPI-director Jan Egeland, former director of the International Peace Research Institute (PRIO) Stein Tønnesson and former Minister of Foreign Affairs and president of Red Cross Norway, Thorvald Stoltenberg.

Nominations
The Nominations Committee accepts nominations from all interested parties. The nominees have to be either a student or a student organization. The Nominations Committee is composed of students from various Norwegian universities and colleges.

The Prize
As of 2009, the prize laureate receives 50 000 NOK (about €5000) and is invited to the award ceremony during the International Student Festival in Trondheim (ISFiT). The recipient or a chosen representative then makes a tour of Norwegian cities that gives an opportunity to meet humanitarian organizations and prominent politicians. The Prize money is awarded from an independent fund which is governed by the Student Welfare Organization in Trondheim.

Laureates of the Student Peace Prize

 1999 – ETSSC, a student organization in East Timor, and Antero Benedito da Silva
 2001 – ABFSU, a student organization in Burma, and Min Ko Naing
 2003 – ZINASU, a student organization in Zimbabwe
 2005 – ACEU, a student organization in Colombia
 2007 – Charm Tong from Burma
 2009 – Elkouria «Rabab» Amidane from Western Sahara
 2011 – Duško Kostić from Croatia
 2013 – Majid Tavakoli from Iran
 2015 – Ayat Al-Qurmezi from Bahrain
 2017 – Hajer Sharief from Libya
 2019 – Fasiha Hassan from South Africa
 2021 –  METU LGBT+ Solidarity from Middle East Technical University, Ankara, Turkey
 2022 –  DOXA Magazine from Russia

External links
 Official website
 ISFiT's website

References

Human rights awards
Peace awards
Student awards